Sergi Nus Casanova (born 23 December 1996) is a former professional Spanish footballer who played as a defender for South Georgia Tormenta in USL League One from 2020 until 2022 after his time in Lithuania with FK Kauno Žalgiris.

Nus is the current assistant coach at Oregon State University for the Men's Soccer team under Terry Boss, the former assistant coach of the US National Team.

Career

Youth
Nus spent time with the academy sides at Gimnàstic Tarragona and Reus. After accomplishing multiples u-15 and u-18 championships and rejecting multiple professional offers, Nus decided to move to the United States in order to pursue new challenges as student-athlete.

College & Amateur
Nus moved to the United States to play college soccer in 2015, attending Fresno Pacific University where he made 19 appearances and scoring 1 goal in his freshman season, helping Fresno Pacific win the PacWest Conference championship and being named All-PacWest Conference Second Team.

In 2016, Nus transferred to the University of Virginia, playing two full seasons for the Cavaliers and missing the 2018 season due to injury. During his time at Virginia, Nus made 41 appearances, scored 9 goals and was named  Third-Team All-Region by NSCAA, Third-Team All-ACC honoree, United Soccer Coaches Second Team All-South Region selection, was named to the ACC All-Academic Team and also listed on the ACC Academic Honor Roll.

Nus played his senior season at Duke University in 2019, making 11 appearances.

During his time at college, Nus also appeared for Fresno Fuego in the USL League Two between 2015 and 2017, and spent a summer with North Carolina FC U23 in 2019. Nus was set to play with South Georgia Tormenta 2 in 2020, but the season was cancelled due to the COVID-19 pandemic.

Professional
On 11 December 2020, Nus signed with South Georgia Tormenta of USL League One ahead of their 2021 season. He made his professional debut on 17 April 2021, starting against Fort Lauderdale CF.

Personal
Sergi's brother is Gerard Nus, a current football coach.

References

External links
Sergi Nus - 2019 - Men's Soccer at Duke Athletics
Sergi Nus at Virginia Athletics
Sergi Nus - 2015 - Men's Soccer at Fresno Pacific Athletics

1996 births
Association football defenders
Duke Blue Devils men's soccer players
Expatriate soccer players in the United States
Fresno Fuego players
Fresno Pacific Sunbirds men's soccer players
Living people
North Carolina FC U23 players
Spanish expatriate footballers
Spanish expatriate sportspeople in the United States
Spanish footballers
Tormenta FC players
USL League One players
USL League Two players
Virginia Cavaliers men's soccer players